is a town located in Iwate Prefecture, Japan. , the town had an estimated population of 15,398, and a population density of 51 persons per km² in 6,858 households.

Geography
Hirono is located in far northeastern Iwate Prefecture, bordered by Aomori Prefecture to the north and the Pacific Ocean to the east.

Neighboring municipalities
Aomori Prefecture
Hashikami
Iwate Prefecture
Kuji
Karumai

Climate
Hirono has a humid oceanic climate (Köppen climate classification Cfa) characterized by mild summers and cold winters. The average annual temperature in Hirono is 9.5 °C. The average annual rainfall is 1168 mm with September as the wettest month and February as the driest month. The temperatures are highest on average in August, at around 22.3 °C, and lowest in January, at around -2.1 °C.

Demographics
Per Japanese census data, the population of Hirono has declined over the past 40 years.

History
The area of present-day Hirono was part of ancient Mutsu Province, and was dominated by the Nambu clan from the Muromachi period. During the Edo period, the area was part of Hachinohe Domain under the Tokugawa shogunate. In the early Meiji period, the villages of Taneichi, Nakano and Ōno within Kita-Kunohe District were created on April 1, 1889 with the establishment of the modern municipalities system. Kita-Kunohe District and Minami-Kunohe Districts merged to form Kunohe District on April 1, 1897. Taneichi was raised to town status on April 1, 1951, annexing the village of Nakano on February 11, 1955. Taneichi merged with Ōno on January 1, 2006 and was renamed Hirono. The new name, combining characters for "ocean" (洋) and "fields" (野), reflected the combination of coastal Taneichi with inland Ōno. The 2011 Tōhoku earthquake and tsunami severely damaged local fishing ports and destroyed some houses in coastal areas, but the center of the town was protected by a  embankment, and the town suffered no casualties in the disaster.

Economy
Hirono is within the economic sphere of nearby Hachinohe, Aomori. The local economy is based on commercial fishing and to a lesser extent on agriculture (shiitake, spinach and rice).

Education
Hirono has eight public elementary schools and four public middle schools operated by the town government, and two public high schools operated by the Iwate Prefectural Board of Education.

Transportation

Railway
East Japan Railway Company (JR East) - Hachinohe Line
  -  -  -  -  -  -  -

Highway

Local attractions
Symboli Ranch, specializing in race horses

Local Specialties
Taneichi takes pride in its sea urchins. It is common in restaurants and has its own yearly festival in July, the Taneichi Sea Urchin Festival. Some of the sea urchins are harvested by means of Nanbu diving (南部もぐり), which is taught in a special program at Taneichi Senior High School. Sea pineapples (class Ascidiacea) are also harvested in Taneichi. Ōno takes pride in its various dairy products.

Notable people from Hirono
Ishinosuke Uwano – former Imperial Japanese Army soldier
Kentaro Kudo – politician

References

External links

Official Website 

 
Towns in Iwate Prefecture
Populated coastal places in Japan